Rimouski is a provincial electoral district in the Bas-Saint-Laurent region of Quebec, Canada, that elects members to the National Assembly of Quebec.  It notably includes the municipalities of Rimouski and Saint-Anaclet-de-Lessard.

It was created for the 1867 election (and an electoral district of that name existed earlier in the Legislative Assembly of the Province of Canada and the Legislative Assembly of Lower Canada).

In the change from the 2001 to the 2011 electoral map, it lost Lac-des-Aigles and Biencourt to the newly created Rivière-du-Loup–Témiscouata electoral district.

Members of the Legislative Assembly / National Assembly

Linguistic demographics
Francophone: 99.3%
Anglophone: 0.5%
Allophone: 0.2%

Election results

|-

|-
 
|Liberal
|Raymond Giguère
|align="right"|9,424
|align="right"|35.33
|align="right"|

|-

|-
|}

|-

|-
 
|Liberal
|Hélène Ménard
|align="right"|6,988
|align="right"|21.94
|align="right"|
|-

|-

|-
|}

|-

|-
  
|Liberal
|Gaston Pelletier
|align="right"|10,817
|align="right"|36.40
|align="right"|

|-
|}

References

External links
Information
 Elections Quebec

Election results
 Election results (National Assembly)
 Election results (Elections Quebec)

Maps
 2011 map (PDF)
 2001 map (Flash)
2001–2011 changes (Flash)
1992–2001 changes (Flash)
 Electoral map of Bas-Saint-Laurent region
 Quebec electoral map, 2011 

Rimouski
Rimouski